Carter is an unincorporated community in Tripp County, South Dakota, United States. Carter is located on U.S. Route 18, west of Winner.

Carter was laid out in 1909, and most likely was named in honor of Jervis W. Carter, a land agent.

References

Unincorporated communities in Tripp County, South Dakota
Unincorporated communities in South Dakota